Callopistria mollissima, the pink-shaded fern moth, is a species of moth in the family Noctuidae (the owlet moths).

The MONA or Hodges number for Callopistria mollissima is 9631.

References

Further reading

External links
 

Noctuidae
Articles created by Qbugbot
Moths described in 1852